Luehea is a genus of trees in the family Malvaceae.

Its native range stretches from Mexico to southern tropical America and Cuba. It is native to the countries of; Argentina, Belize, Bolivia, Brazil, Colombia, Costa Rica, Cuba, Ecuador, El Salvador, French Guiana, Guatemala, Guyana, Honduras, Mexico, Nicaragua, Panamá, Paraguay, Peru, Suriname, Uruguay and Venezuela.
It has been introduced into; Bangladesh, Dominican Republic and Puerto Rico.

The genus name of Luehea is in honour of Carl Emil von der Luehe or Lühe (1751–1801), a German botanist and chamberlain of Princess Caroline-Mathilde of Denmark; later a chamberlain in Vienna, Austria.
It was first described and published by Carl Ludwig Willdenow in Neue Schriften Ges. Naturf. Freunde Berlin Vol.3 on page 410 in 1801.

Known species

The type species is Luehea speciosa.

According to the IUCN Red List of plants; Luehea candicans, Luehea candida, Luehea speciosa, Luehea cymulosa, Luehea divaricata,  Luehea paniculata, Luehea ochrophylla and Luehea seemannii are all listed as Least concern plants.

References

External links
 

Grewioideae
Malvaceae genera
Plants described in 1801
Flora of Central America